Sonia Tumiotto (born 14 July 2001) is a Tanzanian swimmer. She competed in the women's 100 metre freestyle and the women's 200 metre freestyle events at the 2017 World Aquatics Championships. In 2018, she competed in the girls' 100 metre freestyle event at the 2018 Summer Youth Olympics held in Buenos Aires, Argentina. She did not advance to compete in the semi-finals. She also competed in the girls' 200 metre freestyle event.

References

2001 births
Living people
Tanzanian female swimmers
Swimmers at the 2018 Summer Youth Olympics
Place of birth missing (living people)
Tanzanian female freestyle swimmers